Coccorella is a genus of sabertooth fishes.

Species
There are currently two recognized species in this genus:
 Coccorella atlantica (A. E. Parr, 1928) (Atlantic sabretooth)
 Coccorella atrata (Alcock, 1894)

References

Evermannellidae
Marine fish genera
Taxa named by Louis Roule